"Home on the Range" is a classic cowboy song, sometimes called the "unofficial anthem" of the American West. Dr. Brewster M. Higley (also spelled Highley) of Smith County, Kansas, wrote the lyrics as the poem "My Western Home" in 1872 or 1873, with at least one source indicating it was written as early as 1871.

On June 30, 1947, "Home on the Range" became the Kansas state song. In 2010, members of the Western Writers of America chose it as one of the Top 100 western songs of all time.

History

In 1871, Higley moved from Indiana and acquired land in Smith County, Kansas under the Homestead Act, living in a small cabin near West Beaver Creek. Higley was inspired by his surroundings and wrote "My Western Home", which was published in the Smith County Pioneer (KS) newspaper in 1873 or 1874 and republished March 21, 1874 in The Kirwin Chief.  Higley's cabin home is now listed on the National Register of Historic Places as the Home on the Range Cabin.

Daniel E. Kelley (1808–1905), a friend of Higley and member of the Harlan Brothers Orchestra, developed a melody for the song on his guitar. Higley's original lyrics are similar to those of the modern version of the song, but not identical. For instance, the original poem did not contain the words "on the range". Ranchers, cowboys, and other western settlers adopted the song as a rural anthem and it spread throughout the United States in various forms. In 1925, Texas composer David W. Guion (1892–1981) arranged it as sheet music that was published by G. Schirmer. The song has since gone by a number of names, the most common being "Home on the Range" and "Western Home". It was officially adopted as the state song of Kansas on June 30, 1947 and is commonly regarded as the unofficial anthem of the American West.

On September 27, 1933, Bing Crosby recorded "Home on the Range" with Lennie Hayton and his orchestra for Brunswick Records. At the time, the origins of "Home on the Range" were obscure and widely debated, although it had been published in 1910 in folklorist John Lomax's Cowboy Songs and Other Frontier Ballads. Lomax reported that he had learned the song from a black saloon keeper in Texas who recalled learning it on the Chisholm Trail. Its popularity led to William and Mary Goodwin filing a suit for copyright infringement in 1934 for $500,000. In 1905 the couple had published "An Arizona Home", similar to "Home on the Range".  The lawsuit initiated a search for the song's background.

As it turned out, controversy and even outright plagiarism have followed the song's lyrics since their publication.  On Feb. 26, 1876, the Kirwin Chief published an article on the front page titled, "PLAGIARISM," accusing The Stockton News of publishing a nearly identical poem credited to a Mrs. Emma Race of Raceburgh, KS.  The Kirwin Chief, which had published the poem Mar. 26, 1874, reprinted the poem below the article. When Samuel Moanfeldt investigated the history of "Home on the Range" on behalf of the Music Publishers Protection Association in response to the Goodwins' 1934 lawsuit, he found another, similar song, "Colorado Home". However, within a few months, Moanfeldt determined Higley had written the poem behind "Home on the Range", and set to music by Kelley. It seemed likely that cowboys on the Chisholm Trail played a role in making the song known throughout several states.

Modern usage
Bing Crosby recorded the song again in 1938 and 1939. Frank Sinatra also recorded the song on March 10, 1946 and his version was released in Great Britain but was not available in the United States until 1993. Others who have recorded the song include John Charles Thomas, Connie Francis, Gene Autry, Boxcar Willie, Burl Ives, Pete Seeger, Johnnie Ray, Slim Whitman, Steve Lawrence and Tori Amos. "Home on the Range" is often performed in programs and concerts of American patriotic music and is frequently used in plays and films. The song is also the theme opening music for the early Western films starring Ray "Crash" Corrigan and his two co-stars in their movie roles as "The Three Mesqueteers".

It is also featured in the 1937 screwball comedy The Awful Truth (sung by Irene Dunne and Ralph Bellamy), the 1948 film Mr. Blandings Builds His Dream House (sung by both Cary Grant and Myrna Loy), the 1967 off-Broadway musical You're a Good Man, Charlie Brown (sung by the cast as a glee club rehearsal number), the 1980 film Where the Buffalo Roam (sung by Neil Young over the opening credits), the 2009 film The Messenger (sung by Willie Nelson over the closing credits), and the 1946 western film Colorado Serenade (sung by actor Roscoe Ates). Actor Harry Dean Stanton (as the angel "Gideon") sings an excerpt from his mid-tree perch in the 1985 film One Magic Christmas. A parody version is sung by villain Percival McLeach in the 1990 animated film The Rescuers Down Under.

The song has made its way into screen shorts for children and adults, as in the 1954 Looney Tunes cartoon Claws for Alarm, where it is sung by Porky Pig. Likewise, Bugs Bunny sings the song in both The Fair-Haired Hare (1951) and Oily Hare (1952), the latter containing original lyrics specific to Texas oilmen.

The song is used in The Simpsons episode "Lisa's Substitute" (1991) in which Lisa is inspired by a substitute teacher who dresses as a cowboy and sings the song with commentary. It was also used on the Shining Time Station episode "A Dog's Life."

It made an appearance on GLOW when Debbie Eagan (played by Betty Gilpin) sang a portion in the fourth episode of the second season.

Vikingarna recorded an instrumental version of the song on the 1981 album Kramgoa låtar 9 , entitled "Home on the Ranch".

In 2017, a docudrama was released that told the story of the song's origins and the lawsuit from the 1930s that finally concluded the authorship of the song. The film was produced by the People's Heartland Foundation and Lone Chimney Films and featured actors Buck Taylor, Rance Howard, Darby Hinton, and the voice of the Kansas City Chiefs, Mitch Holthus. The film also included music contributed by Kansas, Sons of the Pioneers, Michael Martin Murphey, and others. The film was directed by Ken Spurgeon and aired on regional PBS stations.

Major versions compared

See Mecham (1949) for a discussion of differences in lyrics amongst sources as well as definitions of terms.

In popular culture
The first and sixth verses of John A. Lomax's 1910 version, "A Home on the Range," are heard in the "Glee Club Rehearsal" sequence of the Broadway musical You're a Good Man, Charlie Brown.

Explanatory notes

References

External links
  
 
 (for additional history) 
 Brewster Higley Ohio Historical Marker
 Home on the Range Cabin, cabin near Athol, Kansas where the song Home on the Range was written.
 The sheet music
 free-scores.com

1872 poems
American culture
American folk songs
American patriotic songs
Burl Ives songs
History of the American West
Music of Kansas
Symbols of Kansas
United States state songs
Western music (North America)